The 2020 season was the Denver Broncos' 51st in the National Football League, their 61st overall and their second under head coach Vic Fangio. It also marked the team's 20th season playing their home games in their current venue, Empower Field at Mile High, as well as the 10th and final season with John Elway serving as the general manager.

The Broncos failed to improve on their 7–9 record from 2019, while decimated by numerous injuries and struggling with poor offensive performances, ranking in the bottom quarter in several statistical categories. The Broncos suffered their fourth consecutive losing season—the team's second-longest streak behind 1963–1972, and missed the playoffs for a fifth consecutive season—tied with 2006–2010 for the second-longest streak in franchise history, behind 1960–1976. In addition, it was the Broncos' second season of 11 or more losses in four seasons, after only having two such seasons from 1990 to 2016. For the first time since 2010, the Broncos were unable to win two consecutive games in consecutive weeks without a bye.

Coaching changes
January 10: Outside linebackers coach Brandon Staley departed to become the defensive coordinator of the Los Angeles Rams.
January 12: Offensive coordinator Rich Scangarello was fired after only one season, following a 2019 season in which the Broncos ranked in the bottom five in several offensive categories, including scoring offense and total yardage. Two days later (January 14), Scangarello was replaced by Pat Shurmur, who served as the New York Giants' head coach during the previous two seasons. Shurmur will become the Broncos' fifth offensive coordinator in as many seasons.
January 15: Quarterbacks coach T. C. McCartney was fired after only one season.
January 28: Mike Shula, who served as the Giants' offensive coordinator in 2018 and 2019 alongside Pat Shurmur, was named quarterbacks coach.
February 6: John Pagano was named outside linebackers coach, replacing Brandon Staley. Pagano worked in the same position with the Houston Texans during the previous two seasons.

Roster changes

Future contracts
All players listed below were signed to reserve/future contracts on December 31, 2019, unless noted otherwise. The signings include all ten players who were on the practice squad of the final roster at the end of the 2019 season. Each player was officially added to the active roster on March 18—the first day of the 2020 league year.

Free agents

Unrestricted

Note: Unrestricted free agents who were originally Restricted Free Agents (RFA) had three accrued seasons whose contracts expired at the end of the previous season, and did not receive a qualifying offer before the start of the 2020 league year on March 18.

Restricted and exclusive-rights

Signings

Departures

Trades
 March 18: Fullback Andy Janovich was traded to the Cleveland Browns in exchange for a seventh-round selection in the 2021 draft.
 September 2: Cornerback Isaac Yiadom was traded to the New York Giants in exchange for a seventh-round selection in the 2021 draft.
 September 4: Defensive end Christian Covington, signed by the Broncos in April, was traded to the Cincinnati Bengals in exchange for linebacker Austin Calitro.

Draft

Draft trades

Undrafted free agents
All undrafted free agents were signed on April 26—one day after the 2020 NFL Draft concluded, unless noted otherwise.

Suspensions
On December 9, cornerback A. J. Bouye was suspended for six games—the last four games of 2020 and the first two games in 2021—for violating the league's policy on performance-enhancing substances.

Injuries

Practice squad elevations
Under new NFL rules for the 2020 season, teams are permitted to elevate up to two players from the practice squad to the active game day roster per week, with those designated players being allowed to return to the practice squad up to two times without being exposed to waivers. If a practice squad player is elevated to the game day roster for a third time, that player will be required to clear waivers before returning to the practice squad. Teams are also permitted to protect a maximum of four practice squad players to prevent opposing teams from signing those players to their active rosters.

Notes: Josh Watson was elevated as a COVID-19 replacement from Weeks 10–15, while Troy Fumagalli and Alijah Holder were identified as COVID-19 replacements from Weeks 12–14.

Staff

Final roster

Preseason
The Broncos' preseason schedule was announced on May 7, but was later cancelled due to the COVID-19 pandemic.

Regular season

Schedule
The Broncos' 2020 schedule was announced on May 7.

Note: Intra-division opponents are in bold text.

Game summaries

Week 1: vs. Tennessee Titans

The Broncos played host to the Tennessee Titans in the second half of the Week 1 Monday Night doubleheader. After Titans' placekicker Stephen Gostkowski missed wide right on a 47-yard field goal attempt, the Broncos' grabbed the early lead, with a 9-yard touchdown pass from quarterback Drew Lock to tight end Noah Fant toward the end of the first quarter. However, on the Broncos' next possession, running back Melvin Gordon  lost a fumble at the 25-yard line, and with a short field, the Titans capitalized five plays later, with quarterback Ryan Tannehill connecting with tight end MyCole Pruitt on a 1-yard touchdown pass. The Broncos earned a 1st-and-goal opportunity at the 2-yard line on their next possession, but failed to reach the end zone on all four plays. The Titans were attempting to take the lead just before halftime, however, Gostkowski's 44-yard field goal attempt was blocked by defensive end Shelby Harris.

The Broncos' offense went three-and-out on both of their third quarter possessions, with another missed field goal attempt by Gostkowski in between—from 42 yards out. The Titans took the lead early in the fourth quarter, with Tannehill throwing a 1-yard touchdown pass to tight end Jonnu Smith. However, Gostkowski missed wide left on the extra-point attempt, leaving the score at 13–7. The Broncos responded, and took a 14–13 lead, with Gordon rushing for a 1-yard touchdown at the 9:12 mark of the fourth quarter. Each team exchanged punts on their next two possessions, and the Broncos failed to convert a critical third down play, in which Lock overthrew wide receiver DaeSean Hamilton in the end zone. The Titans started their final possession with 3:05 left in the game, and reached the Broncos' 7-yard line. With 20 seconds remaining, Gostkowski atoned for his earlier missed kicks, with a 25-yard field goal to give the Titans a 16–14 win. The Broncos had one last possession, but could not advance past their own 43-yard line.

Notes:

This was the Broncos' first home loss to the Tennessee Titans since 1987, when the franchise was known as the Houston Oilers.

Week 2: at Pittsburgh Steelers

On the Broncos' second possession, quarterback Drew Lock was strip-sacked by Steelers' linebacker Bud Dupree, resulting in Lock leaving the game midway through the first quarter with a shoulder injury. Lock was replaced by backup quarterback Jeff Driskel. The Steelers took advantage of the Lock fumble, with running back James Conner rushing for a 2-yard touchdown. The only scoring play by the Broncos in the first half came courtesy of a 49-yard field goal by placekicker Brandon McManus, who missed wide right on a 58-yard attempt later in the second quarter. One play after an 81-yard touchdown by Steelers' return specialist Diontae Johnson on a punt return was nullified by an illegal block penalty, quarterback Ben Roethlisberger launched an 84-yard touchdown pass to wide receiver Chase Claypool. Just before the two-minute warning, Driskel was intercepted by cornerback Joe Haden, and the Steelers added a 21-yard field goal by placekicker Chris Boswell just before halftime, for a 17–3 Steelers' lead.

On the initial possession of the third quarter, Roethlisberger was intercepted by safety Justin Simmons. The Broncos' offense marched down the field and reached the Steelers' 4-yard line, but were forced to settle for a 28-yard field goal by McManus. After forcing a turnover on downs, the Broncos finally reached the end zone and narrowed the Steelers' lead to 17–14, with Driskel connecting on a 20-yard touchdown pass to tight end Noah Fant, coupled with a two-point conversion from Driskel to Fant. The Steelers responded on their next possession, with a 28-yard pass from Roethlisberger to Johnson. Broncos' punter Sam Martin fumbled a punt snap early in the fourth quarter and was tackled in the end zone for a safety, increasing the Steelers' lead to 26–14. However, the Broncos' defense forced a fumble near midfield on the Steelers' next possession, and six plays later, Driskel connected with running back Melvin Gordon on a 16-yard touchdown pass midway through the fourth quarter. The Broncos' defense forced a punt, and trailing 26–21 with six minutes remaining in the game, the Broncos started their final possession at their own 18-yard line, and reached the Steelers' 15-yard just before the two-minute warning, hoping for a go-ahead touchdown. However, after an incomplete pass, the Broncos faced a 4th-and-2, and Driskel was sacked by safety Terrell Edmunds, ending the Broncos' rally attempt. The Steelers proceeded to run out the clock.

Week 3: vs. Tampa Bay Buccaneers

The Broncos turned in a dismal performance in a 28–10 loss to the Buccaneers. Punter Sam Martin had a punt blocked in the first quarter, and the Broncos' defense surrendered three touchdown passes to Buccaneers' quarterback Tom Brady—two of which went to wide receiver Mike Evans. The Broncos' only scoring plays occurred in the second quarter—a 56-yard field goal by placekicker Brandon McManus and a 7-yard touchdown pass from quarterback Jeff Driskel to wide receiver Tim Patrick—the latter of which occurred after the Broncos fell into a 23–3 deficit. Driskel, starting in place of the injured Drew Lock, was sacked five times, one of which resulted in a safety. Driskel was later benched in the fourth quarter in favor of backup quarterback Brett Rypien, who drove the Broncos' offense deep into Buccaneers' territory with four minutes remaining in the game, but threw a game-sealing interception near the goal line. With the loss, the Broncos started 0–3 in consecutive seasons for the first time in franchise history. The seats were filled with cutouts of 1,800 characters from the cartoon South Park (which is set in Colorado).

Week 4: at New York Jets

On the game's opening possession, Jets' quarterback Sam Darnold eluded several Broncos' defenders and scrambled for a 46-yard touchdown run. The Broncos then took a 10–7 lead, with a 40-yard field goal by placekicker Brandon McManus, followed in the second quarter by wide receiver Jerry Jeudy scoring his first NFL touchdown—a 48-yard pass from quarterback Brett Rypien, in which Jeudy wrestled an interception away from Jets' cornerback Pierre Desir near the goal line. On the Broncos' next possession, Rypien was intercepted by Desir, and Jets' placekicker Sam Ficken missed wide-left on a 46-yard field goal attempt. However, Broncos' linebacker Joseph Jones was flagged for a 15-yard personal foul penalty for unnecessary roughness on the field goal attempt, and Ficken redeemed himself with a game-tying 26-yard field goal. The Broncos re-claimed the lead, with running back Melvin Gordon rushing for a 1-yard touchdown just after the two-minute warning. Gordon was initially ruled down just short of the goal line, but overturned by a replay review. Another field goal by Ficken—from 38 yards out—narrowed the Broncos' lead to 17–13 just before halftime.

Following a 32-yard field goal by Ficken early in the third quarter, the Broncos increased their lead to 27–16, with Rypien connecting on a 7-yard touchdown pass to wide receiver Tim Patrick, followed by a 54-yard field goal by McManus on the second play of the fourth quarter. Ficken responded on the Jets' next possession, with a 54-yard field goal of his own. Rypien then threw two interceptions, the first of which was returned by Desir for a 35-yard touchdown (with an unsuccessful two-point conversion attempt), the second of which set up a 36-yard field goal by Ficken that temporarily gave the Jets a 28–27 lead with 6:33 remaining in the game. The Broncos reached the Jets' 22-yard line in eight plays, and despite Gordon being stopped for a 3-yard loss and Rypien being flagged for intentional grounding, a 53-yard field goal by McManus gave the Broncos a 30–28 lead at the 3:13 mark of the fourth quarter. The Jets reached midfield just before the two-minute warning, hoping for a game-winning drive, and faced a 3rd-and-3. However, Darnold threw an incomplete pass that was nearly intercepted by Broncos' cornerback De'Vante Bausby, and on 4th-and-3, Darnold was sacked for a 7-yard loss by linebacker Bradley Chubb. As the Broncos were trying to run out the clock and force the Jets to use their timeouts on defense, Gordon sealed the game with a 43-yard touchdown run on the first play from scrimmage. The Broncos benefitted from 15 penalties on the Jets.

Week 6: at New England Patriots

Placekicker Brandon McManus accounted for all of the Broncos' scoring with six field goals—two in each of the first three-quarters—which gave the Broncos an 18–3 lead over the Patriots at the end of the third quarter. Two field goals came courtesy of two turnovers off the Patriots—an interception of quarterback Cam Newton on the Patriots' first possession and a forced fumble off tight end Ryan Izzo by Broncos' cornerback Michael Ojemudia in the third quarter. The Broncos' offense failed to capitalize on two red zone opportunities—one each in the second and third quarters, and had to settle on two of McManus' six field goals—from 20 and 27 yards out. Quarterback Drew Lock misfired on two potential touchdown passes to rookie tight end Albert Okwuegbunam and came up just short of the goal line on a sideline scramble. The Patriots' only scoring play throughout the first three-quarters was a 41-yard field goal by placekicker Nick Folk in the second quarter.

The only touchdown of the game occurred midway through the fourth quarter, with Newton rushing for a 1-yard quarterback sneak. Newton was initially ruled short of the goal line, but was overturned by a successful Patriots' challenge. However, Newton was denied by the Broncos' defense on the ensuing two-point conversion attempt, which would have pulled the Patriots to within a one-score deficit. Following a Lock interception, a 38-yard field goal by Folk narrowed the Broncos' lead to 18–12 with 3:27 remaining in the game. On the Broncos' next possession, Lock threw another interception on the first play from scrimmage, giving the Patriots the football on their own 28-yard line. The Patriots reached the Broncos' 24-yard line with just over a minute remaining, but the Broncos' defense subdued the Patriots' rally attempt. Despite scoring no touchdowns, this was the Broncos' first win at Gillette Stadium since 2006.

Notes

Brandon McManus' six field goals set a new franchise record for field goals in a single game. He also tied Baltimore Ravens' placekicker Justin Tucker for the most games with multiple 50-yard field goals, with six.

Week 7: vs. Kansas City Chiefs

Multiple mistakes doomed the Broncos in snowy and foggy conditions, in a 43–16 loss to their AFC West rivals, the Kansas City Chiefs. Running back Clyde Edwards-Helaire eluded several Broncos' defenders for an 11-yard touchdown run on the Chiefs' first offensive possession. The Broncos responded, with quarterback Drew Lock scrambling for a 2-yard touchdown (with a missed extra-point attempt by placekicker Brandon McManus). Following a 40-yard field goal by Chiefs' placekicker Harrison Butker later in the first quarter, Chiefs' safety Daniel Sorensen returned an interception off Lock 50 yards for a touchdown early in the second quarter. After a 43-yard field goal by McManus, Chiefs' return specialist Byron Pringle returned the ensuing kickoff 102 yards for a touchdown, and the Chiefs dominated the remainder of the game. Broncos' running back Phillip Lindsay rushed for 79 yards, before suffering a concussion after a helmet-to-helmet hit from Sorensen late in the first half. A lost fumble on a flea-flicker attempt between Lock and running back Melvin Gordon led to one of two field goals by Butker in the third quarter. Chiefs' quarterback Patrick Mahomes threw only one touchdown pass—a 10-yarder to wide receiver Tyreek Hill early in the fourth quarter, which gave the Chiefs a commanding 37–9 lead. The Broncos managed only one other scoring play—a 3-yard run by Gordon midway through the fourth quarter, by which time the game had been decided in the Chiefs' favor. One more Chiefs' touchdown—a 1-yard run by backup quarterback Chad Henne, put an end to a disastrous afternoon for the Broncos, who suffered their 10th straight loss to the Chiefs, dating back to 2015.

Week 8: vs. Los Angeles Chargers

On the Chargers' first possession, quarterback Justin Herbert was intercepted by cornerback Justin Simmons, who returned the football 46 yards to the Chargers' 16-yard line. However, the Broncos failed to gain any yardage, and had to settle on a 35-yard field goal by placekicker Brandon McManus. Throughout their next six possessions, the Broncos' offense was stymied by the Chargers' defense, failing to advance past their own 44-yard line (including a kneel down by quarterback Drew Lock on the last play of the first half). The Chargers scored 24 unanswered points, which included three touchdown passes by Herbert—two of them within the last two minutes of the first half, and another on the opening possession of the second half. A 52-yard field goal by placekicker Michael Badgley gave the Chargers a 24–3 lead midway through the third quarter.

However, the Broncos mounted a comeback, with running back Phillip Lindsay rushing for a 55-yard touchdown. After a Lock interception, the Broncos' defense responded, with cornerback Bryce Callahan intercepting a pass from Herbert intended for wide receiver Mike Williams in the end zone for a touchback. The Broncos narrowed the deficit to 24–17 early in the fourth quarter, with Lock connecting on a 9-yard touchdown pass to tight end Albert Okwuegbunam. Badgley added a 47-yard field goal at the 8:02 mark to increase the Chargers' lead. Following a 20-yard run by Lindsay, coupled with a 15-yard personal foul penalty on Chargers' safety Nasir Adderley, Lock threw a 40-yard touchdown pass to wide receiver DaeSean Hamilton. The Chargers then drove 60 yards in 12 plays, forcing the Broncos to call two of their timeouts on defense, and a 33-yard field goal by Badgley gave the Chargers a 30–24 lead with 2:34 remaining in the game.

The Broncos began their final possession at their own 19-yard line. Running back Melvin Gordon converted a 3rd-and-1 for a first down just after the two-minute warning. Then Okwuegbunam drew two defensive pass interference penalties on the Chargers—the first on a 3rd-and-8 at the 1:30 mark, and the other in the end zone on a 4th-and-4 that gave the Broncos the football at the 1-yard line with one second remaining in the game. In between, the Broncos were forced to use their last timeout and Lock spiked the football to stop the clock with 14 seconds remaining. Lock then connected on a game-tying touchdown pass to wide receiver K. J. Hamler as time expired. The play was reviewed, but upheld by instant replay. McManus then kicked the game-winning extra point.

Week 9: at Atlanta Falcons

The Falcons dominated the first half time of possession by a 2 to 1 ratio and took a 20–3 lead over the Broncos at halftime. The Falcons scored on all four of their first half possessions, and quarterback Matt Ryan dissected the Broncos' secondary with three touchdown passes to three different receivers. By the midway point of the third quarter, the Broncos trailed 27–6, with their only scoring coming by way of two field goals by placekicker Brandon McManus—a 43-yarder in the second quarter and a 41-yarder on the opening possession of the second half. The Broncos finally reached the end zone early in the fourth quarter, with quarterback Drew Lock throwing a 20-yard touchdown pass to wide receiver Jerry Jeudy. However, on the first play of their next possession, Lock was intercepted by Falcons' safety Ricardo Allen deep in Broncos' territory, giving the Falcons a very short field. Two plays later, the Falcons increased their lead to 34–13 at the 9:10 mark of the fourth quarter, with running back Todd Gurley rushing for a 4-yard touchdown. The Broncos reached the Falcons' 35-yard line in five plays on their next possession, facing a 4th-and-6, but turned the football over on downs. For the second consecutive week, the Broncos were attempting to rally from a 20+ point deficit, and after forcing a three-and-out by the Falcons' offense, the Broncos narrowed the deficit to 34–20, with Lock connecting on a 9-yard touchdown to wide receiver Tim Patrick. The Broncos' defense forced another Falcons' punt, while using two of their team timeouts, and just before the two-minute warning, Lock scrambled for a 10-yard touchdown to bring the Broncos to within a 34–27 deficit. The Broncos' defense forced a three-and-out, and without any timeouts, had one last possession at their own 20-yard line with only 44 seconds remaining. However, after three incomplete pass attempts by Lock, a fumbled snap on 4th down ended the Broncos' rally attempt.

Week 10: at Las Vegas Raiders

It was the Broncos' first-ever game in Las Vegas against the Raiders. The Broncos' only scoring plays in the first half came courtesy of two field goals by placekicker Brandon McManus—a 50-yarder in the first quarter followed by a 33-yarder in the second quarter. Near the end of the first half, a 5-yard touchdown run by quarterback Drew Lock was negated by a holding penalty on tight end Noah Fant, and Lock was intercepted on the next play. The Broncos only trailed 10–6 at halftime, but things went downhill for the Broncos in the second half, as Lock threw two more interceptions (four total in the game), wide receiver DaeSean Hamilton lost a fumble and the Raiders put the game out of reach with 20 unanswered points. The Broncos' defense surrendered four rushing touchdowns—two apiece to Raiders' running backs Josh Jacobs and Devontae Booker, and the Broncos' only touchdown was a 7-yard pass from Lock to Hamilton late in the fourth quarter.

Week 11: vs. Miami Dolphins

Following an interception by quarterback Drew Lock on the Broncos' opening possession, the Dolphins took the early lead, with quarterback Tua Tagovailoa connecting on a 3-yard touchdown pass to wide receiver DeVante Parker. The Broncos responded toward the end of the first quarter, with running back Melvin Gordon's 1-yard touchdown run. All three scoring plays in the second quarter came by way of field goals—a 29- and 47-yarder by the Broncos' Brandon McManus, with a 41-yarder by the Dolphins' Jason Sanders sandwiched in between. The Broncos took the opening possession of the second half, and reached the Dolphins' 14-yard line. However, instead of kicking a short field goal, Gordon was stopped for no gain on 4th-and-1. After forcing a three-and-out from the Dolphins' offense, the Broncos increased their lead to 20–10 late in the third quarter, with Gordon's 20-yard run—his second touchdown of the game. A struggling Tagovailoa was replaced by Ryan Fitzpatrick in the fourth quarter, and a 53-yard field goal by Sanders narrowed the Broncos' lead to 20–13 midway through the fourth quarter. The Broncos reached the 9-yard line five plays later, and were hoping to add to their lead. However, Gordon lost a fumble after Dolphins' linebacker Andrew Van Ginkel knocked the football out before Gordon reached the goal line, after the play was initially ruled a touchdown. With 5:13 remaining in the game, the Dolphins got the football back at their own 1-yard line, hoping for a rally. Fitzpatrick led the Dolphins to the Broncos' 29-yard line in nine plays; however, a pass into the end zone intended for Parker was intercepted by safety Justin Simmons just before the 2-minute warning, and the Broncos subsequently ran out the clock.

Week 12: vs. New Orleans Saints

After all true quarterbacks were placed in COVID-19 protocol one day prior to the game, the Broncos were forced to turn to undrafted wide receiver and former college quarterback Kendall Hinton as the emergency quarterback, in an ugly 31–3 loss to the Saints. Hinton completed only one pass for 13 yards in 9 attempts—the fewest pass completions in a single game in franchise history, and was intercepted twice. The Broncos' only scoring play was a 58-yard field goal by placekicker Brandon McManus, which came after gaining only one yard following an interception of Saints' quarterback Taysom Hill midway through the third quarter. Otherwise, the Broncos never gained more than 24 yards on any offensive possession and did not advance past their own 47-yard line. The Broncos' 112 total yards of offense were the second-fewest of any team all season (the Washington Football Team had 108 total yards against the Los Angeles Rams in Week 5). Defensively, the Broncos surrendered four rushing touchdowns—two apiece to Hill and running back Latavius Murray.

Week 13: at Kansas City Chiefs

After being outscored by the Chiefs by a combined score of 96–25 in their previous three meetings, the Broncos hung tough with the defending Super Bowl champions on Sunday Night Football. The Broncos took the opening possession and drove to the Chiefs' 34-yard line; however, a deep pass from quarterback Drew Lock to tight end Troy Fumagalli was intercepted by Chiefs' safety Tyrann Mathieu at the 10-yard line. Following an exchange of field goals in the first quarter—a 53-yarder by the Broncos' Brandon McManus and a 35-yarder by the Chiefs' Harrison Butker, the Broncos took a 10–3 lead, with a 5-yard touchdown pass from Lock to wide receiver Tim Patrick. Two short field goals by Butker within the last three minutes of the second half—from 24 and 23 yards out—narrowed the Broncos' lead to 10–9 at halftime. In between, McManus missed wide-left on a 57-yard attempt that gave that aided the Chiefs in field position to set up Butker's second field goal.

The Chiefs took a 12–10 lead on Butker's fourth field goal of the game—a 31-yarder early in the third quarter. The Broncos reclaimed the lead later in the third quarter, with Lock's second touchdown pass of the game to Patrick—a 10-yarder at the 3:50 mark of the third quarter. However, the Broncos opted for an unsuccessful two-point try, leaving the score at 16–12. Thus far, the Broncos' red zone defense had kept the Chiefs' out of the end zone, until quarterback Patrick Mahomes connected with tight end Travis Kelce on a 20-yard touchdown pass to give the Chiefs' a 19–16 lead with one minute remaining in the third quarter.

After a three-and-out to the start the fourth quarter, the Broncos' defense forced a punt after a 48-yard touchdown pass from Mahomes to wide receiver Tyreek Hill was negated by an offensive holding penalty. On the Broncos' next possession, Lock was unable to connect on two critical pass attempts to wide receivers Jerry Jeudy and K. J. Hamler, only making it to midfield and were forced to punt. The Chiefs then drove down to the Broncos' 30-yard line, and after forcing the Broncos to use the last two of their three team timeouts, a 48-yard field goal by Butker increased the Chiefs' lead to 22–16 with only 1:09 remaining in the game. The Broncos had one last possession, hoping for a game-winning drive, but after a 5-yard completion to Jeudy and two incomplete passes, Lock was intercepted by Mathieu at midfield, ending the Broncos' rally attempt and sending the Broncos to their 11th consecutive loss to the Chiefs, dating back to 2015.

Week 14: at Carolina Panthers

The Broncos got on the scoreboard early in the first quarter, with Diontae Spencer, in his return from the COVID-19 reserve list, returning a punt 83 yards for a touchdown, though placekicker Brandon McManus missed the extra point by hitting the left upright. It was the Broncos' first punt return for a touchdown since 2015. After quarterback Drew Lock was strip-sacked by Panthers' linebacker Jeremy Chinn, defensive end Efe Obada returned the fumble to near the goal line, with Broncos' wide receiver Jerry Jeudy making a touchdown-saving tackle at the 3-yard line. This set up a 3-yard touchdown run by running back Mike Davis, which gave the Panthers a 7–6 lead midway through the second quarter. This was the only time that the Broncos trailed in the game, as Lock threw for 280 yards and four touchdowns—one apiece to tight end Nick Vannett and wide receiver Tim Patrick, and two to K. J. Hamler from 37 and 49 yards out. After Hamler's second touchdown reception, another missed extra point attempt by McManus and an unsuccessful two-point conversion after the Patrick touchdown, the Broncos led 32–20 with four minutes remaining in the game. The Panthers narrowed the Broncos' lead to 32–27 with Davis' second touchdown of the game—a 10-yard run with 3:30 remaining. Though the Broncos were forced to punt, they forced the Panthers to burn all three of their team timeouts on defense. The Panthers had one last possession at their own 27-yard line; however, following a sack of quarterback Teddy Bridgewater by Broncos' defensive end Dre'Mont Jones and two incomplete passes by Bridgewater, the Broncos' defense stopped the Panthers on fourth down just after the two-minute warning.

Week 15: vs. Buffalo Bills

The Broncos were no match for the playoff-bound Bills, in a 48–19 blowout loss. The Broncos' defensive backfield, depleted by injury and suspension, surrendered four touchdowns to Bills' quarterback Josh Allen—two passing and two rushing. The Broncos only trailed 21–13 at halftime, before the Bills blew the game open with 20 unanswered points in the second half. Broncos' quarterback Drew Lock was strip-sacked on the first possession of the second half, which resulted in a 21-yard fumble return by defensive end Jerry Hughes. The Broncos gained a total of 13 yards on the next three possessions. Lock passed for only 132 yards and one touchdown, while running back Melvin Gordon rushed for two touchdowns. With the loss, the Broncos were officially eliminated from postseason contention.

Week 16: at Los Angeles Chargers

The Chargers built a 13–0 lead at halftime, consisting of an 8-yard touchdown pass from quarterback Justin Herbert to running back Austin Ekeler and two field goals by placekicker Michael Badgley—a 37-yarder in the first quarter and a 43-yarder in the second quarter. The first field goal was aided by a 53-yard kickoff return by Nasir Adderley. The Broncos' offense reached the red zone on their initial possession of the game, but quarterback Drew Lock was intercepted by Chargers' cornerback Casey Hayward and placekicker Brandon McManus hit the left upright on a 37-yard field goal attempt early in the second quarter. Following an exchange of punts to start the second half, a 30-yard field goal by McManus put the Broncos on the scoreboard late in the third quarter. Following a 25-yard field goal by Badgley early in the fourth quarter, McManus responded with a 50-yard field goal. After the Broncos' defense forced a three-and-out, the Broncos finally reached the end zone, with Lock's 1-yard quarterback sneak to cap off an 11-play, 72-yard drive. After forcing another Chargers' punt, a 52-yard field goal by McManus tied the game at 16–16 with 2:47 remaining in the game. However, the Broncos' defense was unable to keep the Chargers from moving down the field, and were forced to burn all three of their team timeouts. With 45 seconds remaining, a 37-yard field goal by Badgley gave the Chargers a 19–16 lead. The Broncos had one last possession, and reached midfield with one second remaining. However, Lock's desperation hail mary attempt was intercepted near the goal line, ending the Broncos' rally attempt. Wide receiver Jerry Jeudy dropped five passes, including a surefire touchdown in the third quarter.

Week 17: vs. Las Vegas Raiders

In the 2020 season finale, the Broncos forced four turnovers off the Raiders and committed none, but were unable to prevent a game-winning drive by the Raiders in the game's final minute. After an exchange of field goals by each placekicker in the first quarter—a 22-yarder by the Broncos' Brandon McManus and a 33-yarder by the Raiders' Daniel Carlson, a 1-yard touchdown pass from quarterback Drew Lock to tight end Troy Fumagalli gave the Broncos a 10–3 lead. Broncos' cornerback Michael Ojemudia forced a fumble off Raiders' tight end Darren Waller on the first play of the second quarter; however, McManus missed wide left on a 56-yard field goal attempt. Raiders' quarterback Derek Carr connected with Waller on a 28-yard touchdown pass to tie the game on the Raiders' next possession. The Broncos then drove to the Raiders' 38-yard line, facing a 4th-and-1, but turned the football over on downs. The Raiders then took a 17–10 lead, with a 26-yard touchdown pass from Carr to wide receiver Bryan Edwards. The Broncos had one last possession before halftime, and McManus attempted a 70-yard field goal, but it was blocked.

On the Broncos' first possession of the second half, a 37-yard field goal by McManus narrowed the Raiders' lead to 17–13. Following an exchange of punts, Carr was intercepted by safety Justin Simmons; however, the Broncos were forced to settle for another field goal by McManus—from 26 yards out. Ojemudia forced another fumble—this time off of wide receiver Henry Ruggs—near the end of the third quarter, giving the Broncos a short field, and five plays later, a 10-yard touchdown run by running back Melvin Gordon (with a successful two-point conversion) gave the Broncos a 24–17 lead to start the fourth quarter. Carr threw another interception on the Raiders' next possession; however, the Broncos were unable to capitalize after Lock was sacked for an 11-yard loss at the Raiders' 39-yard line, forcing a punt. The Raiders tied the score at 24–24 midway through the fourth quarter, with running back Josh Jacobs rushing for a 28-yard touchdown. On the third play of the Broncos' next possession, Lock launched a 92-yard touchdown pass to wide receiver Jerry Jeudy—the Broncos' longest pass play since 2008, though they used the first of their three team timeouts on this possession that proved to be costly toward the end of the game.

The Broncos forced a punt on the Raiders' next possession, and with 2:46 remaining in the game, were hoping to run out the clock. The Broncos earned one first down after runs of 7 and 15 yards by Gordon, who was pushed out of bounds on each play. On the next play, Gordon gained 19 yards for what would have been a game-clinching first down; however, it was nullified by an offensive holding penalty on tight end Noah Fant. Following a sack of Lock by Raiders' defensive end Maxx Crosby, a minimal 3-yard gain by Gordon and the exhaustion of all Raiders' team timeouts, the Broncos were forced to punt just after the two-minute warning.

Carr drove the Raiders down the field, and with 27 seconds remaining, faced a 4th-and-goal at the Broncos' 1-yard line. The Broncos used a highly criticized timeout prior to Jacobs rushing for a 1-yard touchdown to pull the Raiders to within 31–30. Carr subsequently connected on a successful two-point conversion to Waller to give the Raiders a 32–31 lead. Without any timeouts and 24 seconds remaining, Lock connected with Jeudy on a 25-yard completion to midfield, and a 5-yard delay of game penalty on the Raiders' defense moved the football to the Raiders' 45-yard line. Following an incomplete pass from Lock to wide receiver Diontae Spencer, McManus attempted a 63-yard field goal, however, it was blocked, giving the Raiders the win and their first season sweep of the Broncos since 2010.

Standings

Division

Conference

Statistics

Team leaders

League rankings

Awards and honors

Pro Bowl and All-Pro selections
Linebacker Bradley Chubb and safety Justin Simmons were selected to the 2021 Pro Bowl. It was the first selection for each player. The 2021 Pro Bowl would have occurred on January 31, 2021, at Allegiant Stadium in Paradise, Nevada; however, due to the COVID-19 pandemic, the Pro Bowl was held as a week-long virtual event, featuring the Pro Bowl rosters being played on the Madden NFL 21 video game. Offensive tackle Garett Bolles was voted to the 2020 All-Pro Team and named to the Second Team.

Impact of the COVID-19 pandemic

Quarterbacks
On November 28, Adam Schefter reported that backup quarterback Jeff Driskel had tested positive for COVID-19, and that starter Drew Lock, as well as third and fourth quarterbacks Brett Rypien and Blake Bortles, had been in physical contact with Driskel without wearing protective masks. Accordingly, all four were placed in league-mandated quarantine and were deemed ineligible to play in the Week 12 (November 29) game vs. the New Orleans Saints. Undrafted wide receiver Kendall Hinton, who played quarterback at Wake Forest and was promoted from the practice squad, served as the emergency starter, with running back Royce Freeman as the backup. Lock, Rypien and Bortles were activated from the Reserve/COVID-19 list on December 1, and returned to the active roster in preparation for the team's Week 13 game at the Kansas City Chiefs, while Driskel returned to the active roster on December 16.

Other players
 July 28: Defensive tackle Kyle Peko was placed on the Reserve/Higher Risk Opt-Out list.
 July 30: Tight end Andrew Beck was placed on the COVID-19 reserve list. He returned to the active roster on December 5.
 August 3: Offensive tackle Ja'Wuan James opted out for the 2020 season.
 August 25: Defensive end Joel Heath was placed on the Reserve/Higher Risk Opt-Out list.
 October 30: Guard Graham Glasgow tested positive for COVID-19, two days ahead of the team's Week 8 game vs. the Los Angeles Chargers, resulting in the cancellation of practice that same day. He was subsequently placed on the Reserve/COVID-19 list, and returned to the active roster on November 11.
 November 4: Defensive end Shelby Harris was placed on the COVID-19 reserve list, and returned to the active roster on December 2.
 November 27: Wide receiver/return specialist Diontae Spencer was placed on the COVID-19 reserve list, and returned to the active roster on December 10.
 December 14: Placekicker Brandon McManus was placed on the COVID-19 reserve list, and returned to the active roster on December 22.

Coaching staff and Front office
 October 17: One day before the Broncos' Week 6 game at the New England Patriots, running backs coach Curtis Modkins tested positive for COVID-19. Despite not having any symptoms, he did not travel with the team to New England.
 October 30: Two days before the Broncos' Week 8 game vs. the Los Angeles Chargers, offensive line coach Mike Munchak was placed in COVID protocol, after he either tested positive himself or came in close contact with someone who tested positive for COVID-19.
 November 1: Defensive coordinator Ed Donatell tested positive for COVID-19. After missing six games which required a brief hospital stay, he made his return to the team during the Broncos' Week 14 win over the Carolina Panthers.
 November 3: President of Football Operations/general manager John Elway and team president Joe Ellis each tested positive for COVID-19, after they both reported "minor symptoms" to the medical team.

Team and league discipline
Broncos' head coach Vic Fangio was fined $100,000, and the team was fined an additional $250,000 by the NFL after Fangio failed to wear a face mask during a Week 2 game at the Pittsburgh Steelers. Later in the season, all of the team's quarterbacks—Drew Lock, Brett Rypien, Jeff Driskel and Blake Bortles—were fined an undisclosed amount, after failing to wear a mask during team meetings prior to a Week 12 game vs. the New Orleans Saints.

Fan attendance
Due to the COVID-19 pandemic, the Broncos' Week 1 home opener vs. the Tennessee Titans was played behind closed doors. As the result of an agreement with Governor of Colorado Jared Polis and the Colorado Department of Public Health and Environment, the Broncos admitted 5,226 fans (7% of Empower Field at Mile High's seating capacity) for the team's Week 3 game vs. the Tampa Bay Buccaneers, in which the remaining seats were filled out with cutouts of South Park characters. On October 5, the Broncos were approved to continue admitting 5,700 fans for each remaining home game, and had hopes of increasing spectator capacity later in the season. However, on November 20, the Broncos announced that their Week 11 game vs. the Miami Dolphins was their last with any spectators due to an uptick in positive COVID-19 cases in Colorado, with the final three home games played behind closed doors.

Notes

References

External links
 
 Denver Broncos news, analysis, roster, stats – The Denver Post 
 NFL Nation Blog – ESPN

Denver
Denver Broncos seasons
Denver Broncos